Edgar A. Carlson (September 2, 1929 – June 24, 2008) was a Republican member of the Pennsylvania House of Representatives.

References

Republican Party members of the Pennsylvania House of Representatives
2008 deaths
1929 births
20th-century American politicians